
Gmina Lubrza is a rural gmina (administrative district) in Prudnik County, Opole Voivodeship, in south-western Poland, on the Czech border.

The gmina contains part of the protected area called Opawskie Mountains Landscape Park.

Villages
Gmina Lubrza contains the villages and settlements of Dobroszowice, Dytmarów, Jasiona, Krzyżkowice, Laskowice, Lubrza, Nowy Browiniec, Olszynka, Prężynka, Skrzypiec, Słoków and Trzebina.

Neighbouring gminas
Gmina Lubrza is bordered by the gminas of Biała, Głogówek and Prudnik. It also borders the Czech Republic.

Twin towns – sister cities

Gmina Lubrza is twinned with:

 Dívčí Hrad, Czech Republic
 Hlinka, Czech Republic
 Liptaň, Czech Republic
 Město Albrechtice, Czech Republic
 Slezské Pavlovice, Czech Republic
 Vysoká, Czech Republic

References

Lubrza
Gmina Lubrza